Campanula alpina is a species of perennial bellflower found in the Eastern Alps, Carpathian Mountains and the Balkans. It comprises two subspecies: subsp. alpina found in the Eastern Alps and Carpathians, and subsp. orbelica found in the Balkans.

References 

alpina
Alpine flora
Plants described in 1762
Taxa named by Nikolaus Joseph von Jacquin
Flora of Southeastern Europe
Flora of the Alps
Flora of the Carpathians